Madison Lily Bailey (born January 29, 1999) is an American actress and model. She plays Kiara "Kie" Carrera on the Netflix teen drama series Outer Banks (2020–present).

Career
Bailey originally wanted to be a singer, but transitioned to acting and modeling at age 15 after suffering stage fright while singing in front of people. She began her professional acting career in 2015, appearing in TV series Mr. Mercedes and Constantine. In 2018, she was cast as Wendy Hernandez, a teenage metahuman with the ability to control and manipulate the air, in the CW science fiction TV series Black Lightning, a role she played for two seasons.

Since 2020, she has portrayed Kiara "Kie" Carrera on the Netflix mystery drama Outer Banks .

Personal life
Bailey was born in Kernersville, North Carolina, and was raised in Kernersville by adoptive parents. She has six older siblings, five of who were also adopted through foster care. She is mixed-race and black, and has openly spoken about growing up in a predominantly white household and community. Her mother died in 2018; she and two of her sisters have a tattoo in honor of her memory. Bailey attended East Forsyth High School in Kernersville.

Bailey was diagnosed with borderline personality disorder when she was 18.

Bailey came out as pansexual in 2017, though this information became more well-known in 2020 when she publicized her relationship with University of North Carolina at Charlotte basketball player Mariah Linney.

She enjoys doing her own makeup and has appeared in advertising campaigns for Fenty Beauty.

Filmography

References

External links
 

People from Kernersville, North Carolina
Pansexual actresses
Pansexual women
Living people
People with borderline personality disorder
Actresses from North Carolina
American film actresses
American television actresses
American adoptees
African-American actresses
21st-century African-American people
21st-century African-American women
LGBT people from North Carolina
American LGBT actors
Year of birth missing (living people)